Madeline Elizabeth Adams, known mononymously as Madeline, is a folk singer-songwriter from Athens, Georgia, U.S.

Lately she has been on tour backed by "The White Flag Band" composed of Jacob Morris and Caleb Darnell on bass/banjo/guitar, Theo Hilton on keys, Laura Carter on trumpet/clarinet, Robbie Cucciaro on baritone horn/trumpet, Jim Wilson on drums, and Jason Trahan on guitar.

Overview
Madeline began performing her songs in 2000 in Athens, GA, having grown up there. For a brief time in 2001, she fronted the locally popular dance-pop band Sugar Shakers with Tim Schreiber (now known as Timmy Tumble). She self-released her first album, "Kissing and Dancing," in 2002. It was later re-released by Plan-It-X Records. In 2006, she recorded "The Slow Bang" with Matthew Houck of Phosphorescent at his house in Athens for local label Orange Twin Records. On March 10, 2009, her third full-length album "White Flag" was released, having been recorded over a three-year period. Madeline described the recording of "White Flag" to Paste magazine as "totally different" compared to her previous albums:

As of April 1, 2009, she handled the booking of her own shows and bartended on the side. As of 2017, she lives in Atlanta and works in advertising, copywriting and social media, and fronts the band Flamingo Shadow.

Musical style
Madeline's writing has been described as "lyrics to be pored over," her voice as "haunting."  Additionally, the weblog, "Moving Pictures and Random Noises," has described her compositional technique and style of folk singing as such:

Madeline has also been likened to The Softies, Kimya Dawson, and The Carter Family, as well as 1970's superstars Joni Mitchell and Karen Carpenter.

Discography
Albums

EPs

Footnotes

External links
Official Website
The Official Madeline Myspace Page

Madeline at NPR's All Songs Considered
Madeline bio and store at Orange Twin Records
Madeline on Phoning It In (2008)

Musical groups from Georgia (U.S. state)
Living people
Year of birth missing (living people)